Chaetoceros diadema is a diatom in the genus Chaetoceros. The easiest way to identify this species is by finding the very characteristic diadem-like resting spores.

Species description
Cells united into chains. Very characteristic, diadem - like spores (see species image). One chloroplast. Base of setae is short.

Similar species
Chaetoceros constrictus is quite similar in the vegetative stage, but its resting spores are different from C. diadema resting spores .

References

Further reading

External links
Algaebase
INA card

Coscinodiscophyceae
Species described in 1897